The Lexington Challenger (previously known as the Kentucky Bank Tennis Championships and the Fifth Third Bank Tennis Championships) is a professional tennis tournament played on outdoor hardcourts. It is currently part of the ATP Challenger Tour and the ITF Women's World Tennis Tour, and has been held annually at the Hilary J. Boone Tennis Complex in Lexington, Kentucky, since 1995 for men and since 1997 for women.

The prize money offered at the tournament is $50,000 for men and $60,000 for women (although in 1997–98 it was $25,000 for women).

In 2020, the tournament was held as a once-off WTA Tour tournament. In 2022, it returned to the ITF Circuit.

Women's results

Singles

Doubles

Men's results

Singles

Doubles

References

External links
 Official website

 
ATP Challenger Tour
ITF Women's World Tennis Tour
Hard court tennis tournaments in the United States
Recurring sporting events established in 1995
Tennis in Kentucky